KPQ may refer to:

 KPQ (AM), a radio station (560 AM) licensed to Wenatchee, Washington, United States
 KPQ-FM, a radio station (102.1 FM) licensed to Wenatchee, Washington, United States